Gerry Roufs (1953 – January, 1997), was a Canadian competitive sailor.

Sailing career
Born in Montreal, Canada. In 1978, Gerry Roufs, along with crew Charles Robitaille placed second at the 470 class World Championships held in Marstrand, Sweden.

Death 
He disappeared at sea in his boat, Groupe LG 2 in January 1997, in the South Pacific Ocean, while taking part in the 1996–1997 edition of the Vendée Globe, the round-the-world, single-handed, non-stop yacht race. Roufs was in second place in the race when his Argos position-indicating beacon ceased to transmit. His boat, Groupe LG 2, was found on the coast of Chile in July 1997.

See also
List of people who disappeared mysteriously at sea

References

1953 births
1990s missing person cases
1996 Vendee Globe sailors
1997 deaths
470 class sailors
Canadian male sailors (sport)
Canadian sailors
Canadian Vendee Globe sailors
IMOCA 60 class sailors
People lost at sea
Single-handed sailors
Sportspeople from Montreal